Mylothris flaviana, the yellow dotted border, is a butterfly in the family Pieridae. It is found in Nigeria, Cameroon, the Republic of the Congo, the Democratic Republic of the Congo and Tanzania. The habitat consists of submontane forests.

Subspecies
Mylothris flaviana flaviana (eastern Nigeria, western Cameroon)
Mylothris flaviana interposita Joicey & Talbot, 1921 (south-eastern Cameroon, Congo, Democratic Republic of the Congo, Tanzania)

References

Butterflies described in 1898
Pierini
Butterflies of Africa
Taxa named by Henley Grose-Smith